Single transferable vote (STV) is a multi-winner electoral system in which each voter casts a single vote in the form of a ranked-choice ballot. Voters have the option to rank candidates, and their vote may be transferred according to alternate preferences if their preferred candidate is eliminated or elected with surplus votes, so that their vote is used to elect someone they prefer over others in the running. STV aims to approach proportional representation based on votes cast in the district where it is used, so that each vote is worth about the same as another.

Under STV, no one party or voting bloc can take all the seats in a district unless the number of seats in the district is very small or almost all the votes cast are cast for one party's candidates (which is seldom the case). This makes it different from other district voting systems. In majoritarian/plurality systems such as first-past-the-post (FPTP), instant-runoff voting (IRV; also known as the alternative vote), block voting, and ranked-vote block voting, one party or voting bloc can take all the seats in a district.

The key to STV's approximation of proportionality is that each voter effectively only casts a single vote in a district contest electing multiple winners, while the ranked ballots (and sufficiently large districts) allow the results to approach proportionality. Under STV, multiple winners are selected for a constituency (a multi-member district). Every sizeable group within the district wins at least one seat: the more seats the district has, the smaller the size of the group needed to elect a member. In this way, STV provides approximately proportional representation, ensuring that substantial minority factions have some representation.

STV is distinguished from plurality voting systems, like FPTP, plurality block voting and the single non-transferable vote (SNTV) by the fact that votes are transferable under STV but are not under the other systems. STV reduces the number of "wasted" votes, votes which are cast for unsuccessful candidates by electing multiple representatives for a district. Additionally, surplus votes collected by successful candidates are transferred to aid other candidates, preventing waste caused by successful candidates receiving votes over and above those actually needed to secure the seat.

An important characteristic of STV is that it enables votes to be cast for individual candidates rather than for parties. Party lists are therefore not needed (as opposed to many other proportional electoral systems); it is the voters who create their own ordered list of candidates. The ranked voting also allows voters to form consensus behind the most popular candidates.

Process 
On their ballot, the voter ranks candidates in order of preference. A vote is initially allocated to the voter's first preference. If seats remain open after this first count, votes are transferred as per the following steps.

If that candidate is eliminated, the vote is transferred to the next-preferred candidate rather than being discarded; if the second choice is eliminated, the procedure is iterated to lower-ranked candidates. Under some systems, the vote is apportioned fractionally to different candidates. As long as there are more candidates than seats, the least popular candidate is eliminated, and votes for them are transferred based on voters' subsequent preferences.

Before the election, a quota (the minimum number of votes that guarantees election) is calculated by a specified method, and candidates who accumulate that many votes are declared elected. In some systems, the quota is also used to determine surplus votes, the amount of votes received by successful candidates over and above the quota. Surplus votes are transferred to candidates ranked lower in the voters’ preferences, so they would not be wasted by remaining with a candidate who does not need them.

Transfer of surplus votes is done before any eliminations of candidates. This prevents a party from losing candidates in the early stages who might be elected later through transfers.

Counting, eliminations, and vote transfers continue until enough candidates are declared elected (all seats are filled by candidates reaching the quota) or until there are only as many remaining candidates as there are unfilled seats, at which point the remaining candidates are declared elected. The specific method of transferring votes varies in different systems (see ).

District elections grow more proportionally representative in direct relation to the increase in the number of seats to be elected in a constituencythe more seats, the more the distribution of the seats in a district will be proportional. In a seven-seat STV contest using the Hare quota, any candidate with approximately 14 percent of the vote (either first preferences alone, or a combination of first preferences and lower-ranked preferences transferred from other candidates) will win a seat. Many systems use the Droop quota, which is even smaller than the Hare for the same number of seats.

Because of this quota-based fairness, under STV it is extremely rare for a party to take a majority of the seats in a district without a majority of the district vote. Additionally, a large majority of voters (generally around 80 percent or more) see their vote used to elect someone. Thus under STV, the candidates who make up a majority of the district's elected members are supported directly by a majority of the voters in the district.

Example for a non-partisan election 
Suppose an election is conducted to determine what three foods to serve at a party. There are seven choices: Oranges, Pears, Strawberries, Cake (Strawberry-chocolate), Chocolate, Hamburgers and Chicken. Only three of these may be served.

There are 23 guests, and the hope is that each guest will be served at least one food that they are happy with. It is decided to use STV to make the decision. Each guest is given one vote but is also allowed to cast two optional alternate preferences to be used only if the first preference cannot select a food or to direct transfer of surplus votes if it does. The 23 guests at the party mark their ballots: some mark first, second and third preferences; some mark fewer preferences. When the ballots are counted, it is found that the ballots are marked in seven distinct combinations, as shown in the table below:

The table is read as columns: the left-most column shows that there were four ballots with Orange as the first choice, and Pear as second; while the rightmost column shows there were three ballots with Chicken as first choice and Hamburger second.

The election step-by-step:

Setting the quota: The Droop quota formula is used, giving Quota = total votes / (options to choose + 1) + 1, rounded down = 23 / (3 +1) + 1 rounded down = 6.75 rounded down = 6

Step 1: First-preference votes are counted. Pears reaches the quota with 7 votes, and is therefore elected on the first count, with 1 surplus vote. All of the voters who gave first preference to Pears preferred Strawberry next, so the surplus vote is awarded to Strawberry.

Step 2:  No other option has reached the quota, and there are still two to elect with six options in the race, so elimination of lower-scoring options  starts. Chocolate has the least votes and is eliminated. According to their only voter's next preference, this vote is transferred to Cake. No option has reached the quota, and there are still two to elect with five in the race, so elimination of options will continue next round.

Step 3: Of the remaining options, Strawberry now has the least votes and is eliminated. In accordance to the preferences of both the only voter who voted Strawberry, and the Pear–Strawberry–Cake vote, these votes are transferred to Cake.

Step 4: Cake reaches the quota and is elected. No other option has reached the quota, and there is still one to elect with three in the race, so elimination of options will continue next round.

Step 5: Chicken has the least votes and is eliminated. According to the Chicken voters' next preference, this vote is transferred to Hamburgers.

Step 6: Hamburgers is elected with 7 votes in total. Hamburgers now also has a surplus vote, but this does not matter, since the election is over. There are no more foods needing to be chosenthree have been chosen. Orange ends up being neither elected nor eliminated.

Result: The winners are Pears, Cake, and Hamburgers.

STV in this case produced a higher number of effective votes19 votes were used to elect the successful candidates. (Only the votes placed for Oranges were neither used to select a food nor transferred.)  As well, there was general satisfaction with the choices selected14 voters saw their first preference chosen, and the 9 others saw their second preference chosen. In addition, seven saw their first and third choices selected; one saw his second and third choice selected.

Note that if Hamburger had received only one vote when Chicken was eliminated, it still would have won because the only other remaining candidate, Oranges, has fewer votes so would have been declared defeated in the next round. This would have left Hamburger as the last remaining candidate to fill the last open seat, even if it did not have quota.

Compared to other systems 
This result differs from the one that would have occurred if the voting system used had been non-PR, such as single non-transferable vote (SNTV), first-past-the-post (FPTP) in three districts, first-past-the-post at-large group ticket voting as used to elect members of the U.S. electoral college, or a single-winner majoritarian system in three districts.

Single non-transferable vote results would have had Orange among the three winners, as opposed to Cake, for having a greater number of first-preference votes. Under SNTV, 15 voters would have seen their first preference win (Oranges, Pears and Hamburgers); only 3 voters would have not seen their first preference food served but would have seen their 2nd preference food served. Five voters would not be served any of their favourites.

Under first-past-the-post, the guests would have been split into three groups with one food chosen by each group based on just the most popular food in each group. The result in this case would have been dependent on how the groups are formed (gerrymandering of the groups to bias the election toward a particular result could also occur). It might have been Strawberry donuts, Pears and Hamburgers, but also the foods chosen might have been Pears in two groups (districts) and Hamburgers in the other. Or even just Pears alone might have won in each of the three "districts", in which case only 7 guests out of 23 would have seen their first choice served, a very unrepresentative outcome, given that three different foods could have been served.

Similar problems arise to a lesser degree if all districts use a majority system instead of plurality (for instance, two-round or instant-runoff voting) as at least in all districts the majority would have been quite happy, but that still leaves the minority unrepresented.

It could happen under any three-district single-winner system that none of the groups elect Pears, if the 7 votes for it are split and in each "district" there is another food that beats it (e.g. Oranges, Hamburgers and Chicken).

If the voters had been able to choose only one food to serve (as in first-past-the-post, but without "districts"), it is likely that Pears, the choice of less than a third of the 23 party-goers, would have won, meaning Pears would be the only food served at the party. Even if they held two rounds of voting, the bare majority that prefers some kind of fruit (Oranges, Pears, Strawberries) would have dominated all other choices.

Giving electors a  transferable vote is very different from simply giving each voter more votes to cast. Plurality block voting is such a system. Under it, each voter is given as many votes as there can be winners. This system can produce very unrepresentative results. In the example above, if every voter could vote for three options, the small majority of voters who chose a fruit could easily force all three outcomes to be fruit of some kind: an outcome that is unlikely to be more representative than simply choosing only one winner. In an extreme example, where no faction can command an absolute majority, the largest of the minority groups can force a one-outcome result by running clone candidates. For example, the seven supporters of Pears could arrange in advance to have three types of Pears included on the ballot, then vote for all three, and if no other option reaches more than 7 votes, all three foods would be a type of Pear. The only way this could be avoided would be for those who do not want Pears to vote tactically by not choosing their preferred option, but instead whatever they consider to be the least bad outcome that is still likely to gain the required number of votes.

Example for an election with parties 
Elections with parties are conducted in very similar manner to the non-partisan STV election presented above. Parties actually play no role in STV elections – each voter marks preferences for individual candidates and his or her secondary preferences may cross party lines if so desired.

This example shows election of five members in a district. Party A runs five candidates, Party B runs three, and there is one independent in the race. The election is conducted under STV with the Hare quota, which for five seats is 20% (100% divided by five).

First round 

In the first round, the vote tally of the most popular candidate of Party A, Candidate A3, is more than quota, so they win a seat.

Second, third and fourth rounds 
Surplus votes are distributed; the voters of Candidate A3 have put another politician from their party, Candidate A4, as their second preference, so A4 now receives Candidate A3's surplus votes. This transfer of 5 percent of the votes leaves A3 with the quota (20 percent) and leaves A4 with 13 percent.

In the third and fourth rounds, the least popular candidates are eliminated (Candidates A1 and A5) and their votes transferred to their next preferences. Voters of Candidate A5 are not very partisan, they actually prefer the independent candidate over the other candidates of Party A still in the race.

Fifth and sixth rounds 
In the fifth round, Candidate A2 is eliminated with all their votes going to the candidate A4, the last remaining candidate from Party A, who is elected. The surplus votes of Candidate A4 are transferred. All the voters who helped elect Candidate A4 prefer the independent candidate to the candidates of the other party so their 3% surplus votes will go to Candidate I in the sixth round.

Seventh round 
There are now only four candidates remaining and three seats remaining open. The least popular candidate (Candidate B1) is eliminated. There are now only three candidates in the race, so they are automatically declared elected regardless of whether they reached the quota. If there is no reason to establish relative popularity of the elected members, the count ends there when the last seats are declared filled.

If the ranking of the candidates is important, the votes belonging to Candidate B1 might be transferred as per below, assuming voters' alternate preferences are marked that way.

Under STV, candidates A3, A4, I, B2 and B3 were elected.

This vote count varies from the reality of many STV systems because there were no "exhausted" non-transferable votes. In most real-life STV elections, some votes that are set to be transferred cannot be and the number of votes still in play at the end is lower than the number of votes cast and counted in the 1st round. As well, the Droop quota is usually used in real-life STV elections. With the Droop quota in effect and five seats, it would have taken 17 percent to be elected with quota, not 20 percent as under the Hare quota.

In this case, as in all STV elections, about 80 percent or more of the votes were used to actually elect someone. A majority of the members elected in the district represent the sentiments of a majority of the voters.

Compared to other systems 
This result differs from the one that would have occurred if the voting system used had been non-PR, such as single non-transferable vote (SNTV), first-past-the-post (FPTP) in five districts, first-past-the-post at-large general ticket voting (as used to elect members of the U.S. electoral college), or a single-winner majoritarian system in five districts

This result is different than if all voters could only vote for their first preference but still all seats were filled in a single contest, which is called the single non-transferable vote. Under SNTV, the five candidates most popular when only first preferences are considered were candidates A2, A3, B1, B2 and B3. This means even though Party B's candidates had less support together, they would have received 60% of seats, and Party A only 40%. In this case, Party A overextended themselves by fielding too many candidates, but even if they had strategically nominated only three, they would not necessarily have been successful in gaining three seats instead of two seats, because one or two of their candidates might have taken the lion share of their party votes, leaving not enough votes for the other(s) to be elected. This could be addressed under SNTV if the party voters used coordinated strategic voting.

If voters could vote for five candidates (but not cast ranked votes)) as under the plurality block voting system, a type of multiple non-transferable vote, Party A could have won all seats, leaving Party B and voters of the independent candidate without representation. This is because if all voters of Party A voted for all five of the Party A candidates, every Party A candidate would have been among the five candidates with the most votes and would have been declared elected. That would have meant that Party A with support of only 48 percent of voters would have had all the representation.

Under majority block voting, if voters voted along party lines, every Party A candidate would have received a vote from 48 percent of the voters, and some even up to 55% if voters of Candidate I also voted for some Party A candidates with their 4 other votes. At the same time, Party B's candidates could only get up to 52% of the votes with the same tactics. If the voters are partisan enough, the likely outcome is that party A would take all the seats although Party A took less than half the votes (minority representation) and all other votes are wasted.

In single-winner systems, whether First past the post or majoritarian, the outcome is uncertain. It likely would be that Party A with 48 percent of the votes might achieve a clean sweep of all five seats or easily Party A might take four of the five with Party B taking just one. (The first case would have been achieved by Party B votes being cracked by the district boundaries; the second case would have been achieved by Party B voters being mostly packed into just one district, leaving Party A with easy victories in the other four districts.) On the other hand if districts were drawn in different fashion, Party A and Party B might have divided the seats in a three to two ratio. Even under certain circumstances, the Independent candidate might take a seat if their supporters are sufficiently concentrated in one district.

STV election results are roughly proportional (as much as the number of seats allows) and take into account more than the first preferences of voters. Under STV (as seen in the example above), when it comes to secondary preferences, some voters who like a candidate from a certain party best might prefer an independent (or even a rival party candidate) before other candidates of their first choice's party. This means that even if it seems that some faction (based on first preferences) is over-represented or under-represented in the outcome, the outcome actually closely adheres to a combination of the first preferences of many voters and secondary preferences of most of the other voters. Under STV, about 80 percent of voters see their vote actually used to elect someone they prefer (and even more than that portion see someone they prefer elected even if their vote itself was not used to elect anyone), while under FPTP, often less than half of the votes are used to elect anyone and only the largest group in each district is represented.

Related voting systems
Instant-runoff voting (IRV) is the single-winner analogue of STV. It is also called "single-winner ranked-choice voting". Its goal is representation of a majority of the voters in a district by a single official, as opposed to STV's goals of not only the representation of a majority of voters through the election of multiple officials but also of proportional representation of all the substantial voting blocks in the district.

Single non-transferable vote (SNTV) produces much the same representation as STV, without the work and complication of preferential ballots and vote transfers. Single voting in a multiple-member district produces mixed roughly proportional representation, which STV's vote transfers sometimes does not alter. (An example was the election of Edmonton, Alberta, MLAs through STV in 1930. The winners were the same under STV as would have been elected under SNTV.)

The spare vote is a version of single transferable voting applied to the ranking of parties, first proposed for elections in Germany in 2013. The spare vote system includes the step of transferring the votes of eliminated choices to the next-indicated choice, but it does not transfer surplus votes.

The mixed ballot transferable vote (MBTV) is a mixed version of STV, where voters may rank both candidates and parties, even both interchangeably, depending on the ballot type, but must choose at least a local (district) candidate (1st preference) and a national list (2nd preference). The list preferences are used if the vote is unused in the district election, which may use FPTP, IRV or STV rules; in the STV case, the vote is transferred to another tier in favour of the chosen party list. (This is in contrast to the mixed single vote, which is currently used in Hungary, where voters may not define a separate party-list preference and do not cast preferential votes.)

Indirect single transferable voting is a non-ranked-vote version of STV. Single voting in a multi-seat district is retained. Voters do not mark their ballots with rankings, but votes are transferred, as needed, based on the eliminated or elected candidate's pre-set instructions. This is a useful system to achieve many of the benefits of STV in districts where it is difficult to collect all the ballots in one central place to conduct STV transfers or where X voting is preferred over ranked voting due to voters' inability or disinterest in ranking candidates. Once known as the Gove system, or the schedule system of PR, it was invented by Massachusetts legislator William H. Gove of Salem and Archibald E. Dobbs of Ireland, author of Representative Reform for Ireland (1879). (STV with group ticket Voting also conducts transfers without reference to alternate preferences marked by voters.) In 1884, Charles L. Dodgson (Lewis Caroll) argued for a proportional representation system based on multi-member districts similar to indirect STV, with each voter casting only a single vote, quotas as minimum requirements to take seats, and votes transferable by candidates through what is now called liquid democracy. The difference from "indirect STV" is that under liquid democracy, candidates and members may transfer votes after the votes are cast to build coalitions; they do not have to publish their list beforehand.

The modified d'Hondt electoral system is a variant of STV, where an electoral threshold for parties is applied.

Two-vote MMP and additional member system systems may also be interpreted as a related, effectively preferential mixed system. Votes are not transferred, but a voter may vote differently for the local election and the overall party vote, with one, both or neither of those votes electing someone.

Sequential proportional approval voting is similar to STV in transferring votes and resulting in proportional representation, while in contrast to STV utilizes approval instead of ranking on the ballot.

Terminology
When single transferable voting is used for single-winner elections, it produces a system that is formally called instant-runoff voting or alternative vote.

STV uses preferential votes cast in multi-seat districts, but some use the term "preferential voting" when they are talking only about instant-runoff voting. "Preferential voting" can also refer to a broader category, ranked voting systems. In the United States, STV is sometimes also called preferential voting, choice voting, preference voting, multi-winner ranked choice voting, and proportional ranked-choice voting.

STV used for multi-winner elections is sometimes called "proportional representation through the single transferable vote", or PR-STV or STV-PR (in Scotland). "STV" usually refers to the multi-winner version, as it does in this article.

Hare–Clark is the name given to PR-STV elections in Tasmania and the Australian Capital Territory.

Balloting

In STV, each voter casts just one vote although multiple seats are to be filled in the district. Voters mark first preference and can provide alternate preferences to be used if needed. In practice, the candidates' names are usually organized in columns so that voters are informed of the candidates' party affiliations or whether they are standing as independents.

They may indicate their preferences by ranking the candidates in order of preference. They would use numbers (1, 2, 3 etc.) to show this, with 1 representing first preference.

An alternative way to mark preferences for candidates is to use columns for the voters' preference with the name of each candidate appearing in each column. The first column is used to indicate first preference. An X there goes beside the most preferred candidate. The next column is for the second preference. An X there marks the second-preference candidate, etc.

Some balloting systems allow ticket voting, where a voter simply indicates preference for a party slate, sometimes even ranking party slates, instead of marking preferences for individual candidates.

Some systems declare a ballot spoiled if it is not marked with a minimum amount of preferences. In the ballot for the ACT election, voters are told they must mark at least five preferences if the ballot is to be counted. Sometimes a voter is allowed to mark just their first preference (plump) and not mark any more. Rules vary. Even where second and subsequent preferences are marked, in some cases they may not be consulted at all, such as if the first preference candidate is elected at the end of the count to fill the last seat.

Seat filling by quota

In most STV elections, a quota is established to ensure that all elected candidates are elected with approximately equal numbers of votes. In some STV varieties, votes are totalled, and a quota (the minimum number of votes that guarantees election) is derived. Those who are elected are the most popular, so quota does not affect that. Some say that the importance of quota is to set the amount of votes that are surplus; that is, the amount that should be transferred away from successful candidates.

In some implementations, a quota is simply set by lawany candidate receiving a given number of votes is declared elected, with surplus transferred away. Something like this system was used in New York City from 1937 to 1947. Under such a system, the number of representatives elected varies from election to election with voter turnout. In the 1937 New York City Council election, 26 councillors were elected; in the 1939 New York City Council election, newspapers reported that it was expected that the number of councillors would drop to 17 due to lower voter turnout.

A more common formula sets quota as a percentage of the votes cast. A four-seat district using the Hare quota sets quota as 25 percent of the valid votes; a four-seat district using the Droop quota sets the quota as one more than 20 percent of the valid votes.

Once a quota is determined, candidates' vote tallies are consulted. If at any time a candidate achieves the quota, they are declared elected. Then if there are still unfilled seats, in some STV systems, any surplus votes (those over and above the quota) are transferred to other candidates in proportion to the next-highest preference marked on the ballots received by that candidate, if any.

Usually one or more candidates achieve quota in the first count. If there are still unfilled seats after the surplus is transferred, the count would proceed with the candidate with the fewest votes being eliminated. Their votes would be transferred to other candidates as determined by those voters' next preference, if any. Elections and eliminations, and vote transfers where applicable, continue until enough candidates are declared elected to fill the open seats or until there are only as many remaining candidates as there are unfilled seats, at which point the remaining candidates are declared elected. These last candidates may be elected without surpassing quota, but their survival until the end is taken as proof of their general acceptability by the voters.

Election

An STV election count starts with a count of each voter's first choice, recording how many for each candidate, calculation of the total number of votes and the quota and then taking the following steps:

 A candidate who has reached or exceeded the quota is declared elected.
 If any such elected candidate has more votes than the quota, surplus votes are then transferred to other candidates proportionally based on their next-indicated choice on all the ballots that had been received by that candidate. There are several different ways to do this. (see  ).
 If there are still seats to be filled after the surplus votes of all candidates elected in the first count have been transferred, if any new candidates have been elected, their surplus votes are transferred proportionally.
 If there are still seats to be filled after all surplus votes have been transferred, the candidate with the fewest votes is eliminated and their votes are transferred to the next candidate marked on each ballot. Candidates already elected or eliminated cannot receive votes in most systems.
 This process repeats until either every seat has been filled by candidates surpassing quota or until there are only as many remaining candidates as there are remaining seats, at which point the remaining candidates are declared elected.

There are variations in conducting transfers (see ).

When the number of votes transferred from the losing candidate with the fewest votes is too small to change the ordering of remaining candidates, no transfer is made or more than one candidate is eliminated simultaneously. In most systems, once a candidate has been eliminated or elected, they do not receive any more votes.

Vote transfers and quota

STV systems primarily differ in how they transfer surplus votes and in the size of the quota. For this reason, it has been suggested that STV can be considered a family of voting systems rather than a single system.

If fair results are to be produced and the number of candidates is fixed, a quota must be set such that any candidate who receives that many votes is elected. The quota, if used, must be set at a level where no more candidates can reach quota than there are seats to be filled. It cannot be so small that more candidates can be elected than the number of open seats, but the smaller it is, the fairer the result. There are several ways to specify quotas.

The Droop quota is the one most commonly used. It is generally considered to be the absolute lowest number that elects the correct number of candidates to fill the available seats, at least based on the original number of votes cast.

The Droop quota is given by the floor function formula:

The Droop quota is an extension of the majoritarian principle of requiring a 50% + 1 majority in single-winner elections under instant-runoff voting. Using Droop means 25% plus 1 is the quota in a three-seat contest because no more than three people can each have 25% of the vote + 1; using Droop means 10% of the vote + 1 is the quota in a nine-seat district because no more than nine people can each have 10% of the vote + 1, and so on.

Droop being relatively low means that the largest party, if it has the majority of votes, is likely to take the majority of the seats in a district.

The Hare quota was used in the original proposals by Thomas Hare. It is larger than the Droop and sometimes ensures greater representation to less-popular parties within a district. But also, being larger than Droop, Hare presents more of an obstacle to small parties that hope to take just one seat. Being smaller than Hare, the Droop quota may give a seat to a small party that does not have the votes to take a seat under Hare.

STV minimizes wasted votesvotes cast for a candidate with no chance of winning. Votes cast for a winning candidate are sometimes transferred to the voter's next choice candidate, who is also preferred by the voter. (Any vote is only used once but may be allocated to different candidates along the way until it finds its final place.) Most first-count votes cast for a candidate who wins in the end is never transferred – just the surplus votes are transferred (unless all seats are already filled). Alternate preferences are only consulted if the candidate is unpopular or elected, and not always then. Votes lie where they are when the last seats filled so even under STV not all votes are used to elect someone.

There are variations in the conduct of transfers in different variations of STV, such as how to transfer surplus votes from winning candidates and whether to transfer votes to already-elected candidates.

It can happen that a vote is eligible to be transferred but cannot be because it bears no subsequent preference for any remaining candidate. In the case of transfers of surplus votes, an "exhausted" vote remains with the victorious candidates and only transferable votes (votes bearing a usable alternate preference) are used to determine the transfer of the surplus. If the number of transferable votes is less than the number of the surplus, no calculations are needed to make the transfer. Transfer of the transferable votes is done simply by reference to subsequent preference on the votes. Not all the surplus will be transferred if there are not enough transferable votes.

If the variation of STV used allows transfers to candidates already elected, when a candidate is eliminated and the next preference on the ballot shows preference for a candidate already elected, votes are transferred to already victorious candidate, forming a new surplus. The new surplus votes for the victorious candidate (transferred from the eliminated candidate) are then transferred to the next preference of the victorious candidate, as happened with their initial surplus, but just using the recently transferred votes as guide. Vote transfers from the victorious candidate to a candidate who has been eliminated are impossible, and reference must be made to the next marked preference, if any. See  for details.

A quota set lower than Droop is sometimes workable. If fractional votes are used in an STV method, the Droop quota may be modified so that the fraction is not rounded down.

Frank Britton, of the Election Ballot Services at the Electoral Reform Society, observed that the final plus one of the Droop quota is not needed; the exact quota is then simply . Without fractional votes, the equivalent integer quota may be written:

So, the quota for one seat is 50 of 100 votes, not 51.

In any case, in most STV elections the appearance of non-transferable votes means that the quota could be lowered significantly during the counting of the vote with no danger of having too many elected.

In STV, vote transfers are of two typestransfers of votes of eliminated candidates and transfers of surplus votes of elected candidates. The first type happens more often than the second type. Surplus votes are transferred only after a candidate is elected and then only if there are still open seats to be filled and if the transfers may affect the ranking of the remaining candidates.

Transfers of votes of eliminated candidates
Transfers of votes of eliminated candidates is done simply, without the use of complex math. The next usable preference on the vote gives the destination for the transfer of the vote. If there is no usable preference on the ballot, the vote goes to the "exhausted" or non-transferable pile.

Transfers of surplus votes
The transfer of surplus votes of an elected candidate may be very simply done or may be done more or less intricately, depending on the circumstances and the choice of the government or election officials.

It can happen that a vote is set to be transferred but cannot be because it bears no subsequent preference for any remaining candidate. In transfers of surplus votes, any non-transferable votes are left with the elected candidate.

If the number of transferable votes is less than the surplus, the transfer of surplus votes can be performed just as it is done in the case of transfer of votes of eliminated candidates, the only difference being that non-transferable votes remain with the elected candidate. They do not go to the exhausted pile. Transfer of the transferable votes is done in these cases simply by reference to the next usable preference on the vote.

In cases where the number of transferable votes is more than the surplus, a more-involved method is needed in order to make the transfer proportional and to ensure that the quota left with the successful candidate is proportional as well. But election officials here have a choice of using simpler methods or more involved methods.

The basic formula for how to transfer surplus votes when there are more transferable votes than the surplus to be transferred is:

This can produce fractional votes, which are handled differently under different counting methods.

In addition, not considering later preferences when transferring votes may influence later transfers and are thought of as being random, so instead some places use systems that break down the elected candidate's votes into many separate piles separating the various combinations of marked preferences on the ballots.

In some STV variants, such as those used in the Republic of Ireland (except Senate elections), Malta, and elsewhere, merely the next preference is examined. Votes are transferred as whole votes. Any randomness may arise from the later preferences, if any, that may have to be used later. But choosing the votes at random from the pile means that each transfer should be mixed and likely closely resembles the composition of the entire pile.

The Gregory method (also known as Newland–Britain or Senatorial rules) eliminates randomness by examining all the preferences marked on ballots, the later preferences dictate how later transfers, if any, will go. They transfer votes as fractions of votes. Gregory is in use in Northern Ireland, the Republic of Ireland (Senate elections) and in Australia. Both Gregory and earlier methods have the problem that in some circumstances they do not treat all votes equally. For this reason Meek's method, Warren's method and the Wright system have been invented. As well, there are variants named the inclusive Gregory method (IGM) and the weighted inclusive Gregory method (WIGM).

Meek in 1969 was the first to realize that computers make it possible to count votes in way that is conceptually simpler and closer to the original concept of STV. One advantage of Meek's method is that the quota is adjusted at each stage of counting when the number of votes decreases because some become non-transferable. Meek also considered a variant on his system which allows for equal preferences to be expressed. This has subsequently (since 1998) been used by the John Muir Trust for electing its trustees.

History

Origin 

The concept of transferable voting was first proposed by Thomas Wright Hill in 1819. The system remained unused in public elections until 1855, when Carl Andræ proposed a transferable vote system for elections in Denmark, and his system was used in 1856 to elect the Rigsraad and from 1866 it was also adapted for indirect elections to the second chamber, the Landsting, until 1915.

Although he was not the first to propose transferable votes, the British barrister Thomas Hare is generally credited with the conception of STV, and he may have independently developed the idea in 1857. Hare's view was that STV should be a means of "making the exercise of the suffrage a step in the elevation of the individual character, whether it be found in the majority or the minority." In Hare's original system, he further proposed that electors should have the opportunity of discovering which candidate their vote had ultimately counted for, to improve their personal connection with voting. At the time of Hare's original proposal, the UK did not use the secret ballot, so not only could the voter determine the ultimate role of their vote in the election, the elected MPs would have been able to determine who had voted for them. As Hare envisaged that the whole House of Commons be elected "at large" this would have replaced geographical constituencies with what Hare called "constituencies of interest" – those people who had actually voted for each MP. In modern elections, held by secret ballot, a voter can discover how their vote was distributed by viewing detailed election results. This is particularly easy to do using Meek's method, where only the final weightings of each candidate need to be published. The elected member cannot verify who their supporters are.

The noted political essayist John Stuart Mill was a friend of Hare's and an early proponent of STV, praising it at length in his essay Considerations on Representative Government, in which he writes: "Of all modes in which a national representation can possibly be constituted, this one affords the best security for the intellectual qualifications desirable in the representatives. At present... the only persons who can get elected are those who possess local influence, or make their way by lavish expenditure...." His contemporary, Walter Bagehot, also praised the Hare system for allowing everyone to elect an MP, even ideological minorities, but also argued that the Hare system would create more problems than it solved: "[the Hare system] is inconsistent with the extrinsic independence as well as the inherent moderation of a Parliament – two of the conditions we have seen, are essential to the bare possibility of parliamentary government."

Advocacy of STV spread throughout the British Empire, leading it to be sometimes known as British Proportional Representation. In 1896, Andrew Inglis Clark was successful in persuading the Tasmanian House of Assembly to be the first parliament in the world elected by what became known as the Hare-Clark electoral system, named after himself and Thomas Hare. H. G. Wells was a strong advocate, calling it "Proportional Representation".
The HG Wells formula for scientific voting, repeated, over many years, in his PR writings, to avoid misunderstanding, is Proportional Representation by the single transferable vote in large constituencies.

STV in large constituencies and multiple-member districts permits an approach to the Hare-Mill-Wells ideal of mirror representation. The UK National Health Service used to elect, through the first-past-the-post system in local or regional elections, only white male general practitioners to the General Medical Council. In 1979, the UK National Health Service used STV to proportionally elect women and immigrant GPs, and specialists, to the General Medical Council.

Australia 

Tasmania first used STV for election of members of the Tasmanian House of Assembly from 1896 to 1902. In 1909, it began to be used on a permanent basis for Assembly elections. (Instant-runoff voting was used for elections to the Tasmania Legislative Council (its upper house), with some of the members elected through STV prior to 1946.)

In 1948, single transferable vote proportional representation on a state-by-state basis became the method for electing Senators to the Australian Senate. This change has led to the rise of a number of minor parties such as the Democratic Labor Party, Australian Democrats and Australian Greens who have taken advantage of this system to achieve parliamentary representation and the balance of power. From the 1984 election, group ticket voting was introduced to reduce a high rate of informal voting but in 2016, group tickets were abolished to avoid undue influence of preference deals amongst parties that were seen as distorting election results and a form of optional preferential voting was introduced.

Beginning in the 1970s, Australian states began to reform their upper houses to introduce proportional representation in line with the Federal Senate. The first was the South Australian Legislative Council in 1973, which initially used a party list system (replaced with STV in 1982), followed by the single transferable vote being introduced for the New South Wales Legislative Council in 1978, the Western Australian Legislative Council in 1987 and the Victorian Legislative Council in 2003. The single transferable vote was also introduced for the elections to the Australian Capital Territory Legislative Assembly after a 1992 referendum.

The term STV in Australia refers to the Senate electoral system, a variant of Hare-Clark characterized by the "above the line" group voting ticket, a party list option.  It is used in the Australian upper house, the Senate, most state upper houses, the Tasmanian lower house and the Capital Territory assembly.  There is a compulsory number of preferences for a vote for candidates (below-the-line) to be valid: for the Senate a minimum of 90% of candidates must be scored, in 2013 in New South Wales that meant writing 99 preferences on the ballot. Therefore, 95% and more of voters use the above-the-line option, making the system, in all but name, a party list system. Parties determine the order in which candidates are elected and also control transfers to other lists and this has led to anomalies: preference deals between parties, and "micro parties" which rely entirely on these deals.  Additionally, independent candidates are unelectable unless they form, or join, a group above-the-line. Concerning the development of STV in Australia researchers have observed: "... we see real evidence of the extent to which Australian politicians, particularly at national levels, are prone to fiddle with the electoral system".

As a result of a parliamentary commission investigating the 2013 election, from 2016 the system has been considerably reformed (see 2016 Australian federal election), with group voting tickets (GVTs) abolished and voters no longer required to fill all boxes.

Canada 

STV was used to elect legislators in two Canadian provinces between 1920 and 1955. The cities of Edmonton and Calgary elected their MLAs through STV from 1924 to 1956, when the Alberta provincial government changed those elections to use the first-past-the-post system. The city of Winnipeg elected its MLAs through STV from 1920 to 1955, when the Manitoba provincial government changed those elections to use first-past-the-post.

Less well known is STV use at the municipal level in western Canada. Calgary and Winnipeg used STV for more than 50 years before city elections were changed to use the first-past-the-post system. Nineteen other municipalities, including the capital cities of the other three western provinces, also used STV For elections in about 100 elections during the 1918 to 1931 period.

In British Columbia, Canada, a type of STV called BC-STV was recommended for provincial elections by the British Columbia Citizens' Assembly on Electoral Reform in 2004. In a 2005 provincial referendum, it received 58 percent support and achieved a simple majority in 77 of 79 electoral districts. It was rejected for falling short of the 60 percent threshold that had been set by the BC Liberal provincial government. In a second referendum, on 12 May 2009, BC-STV was defeated 61 percent to 39 percent.

United States 

In the United States, the Proportional Representation League was founded in 1893 to promote STV, and their efforts resulted in its adoption by many city councils in the first half of the 20th century. More than twenty cities have used STV, including Cleveland, Cincinnati and New York City. As of January 2010, it is used to elect the city council and school committee in Cambridge, Massachusetts, the park board in Minneapolis, Minnesota, and the board of assessors in Arden, Delaware. STV has also been adopted for student government elections at several American universities, including Carnegie Mellon, MIT, Oberlin, Reed, UC Berkeley, UC Davis, Vassar, UCLA, Whitman, and UT Austin. The Fair Representation Act, introduced in Congress in June 2017, would have established STV for US House elections starting in 2022.

List of users

STV has seen its widest adoption in the English-speaking world.

National legislatures
The table below lists countries that use STV to fill a nationally elected legislative body by direct elections.

Other bodies

Indirect

Historic use

Benefits 
Advocates for STV argue it is an improvement over winner-take-all non-proportional voting systems such as first-past-the-post, where vote splits commonly result in a majority of voters electing no one and the successful candidate having support from just a minority of the district voters. STV prevents in most cases one party taking all the seats and in its thinning out of the candidates in the field prevents the election of an extreme candidate or party if it does not have enough overall general appeal.

STV is the system of choice of the Proportional Representation Society of Australia (which calls it quota-preferential proportional representation), the Electoral Reform Society in the United Kingdom and FairVote in the United States (which refers to STV as proportional ranked choice voting and instant-runoff voting as "ranked choice voting", although there are other preferential voting methods that use ranked-choice ballots).

Issues

Degree of proportionality
The degree of proportionality of STV election results depends directly on the district magnitude (i.e. the number of seats in each district). While Ireland originally had a median district magnitude of five (ranging from three to nine) in 1923, successive governments lowered this. Systematically lowering the number of representatives from a given district directly benefits larger parties at the expense of smaller ones.

Supposing that the Droop quota is used: in a nine-seat district, the quota or threshold is 10% (plus one vote); in a three-seat district, it would be 25% (plus one vote). This electoral threshold is significantly higher than for most party-list PRs.

A parliamentary committee in 2010 discussed the "increasing trend towards the creation of three-seat constituencies in Ireland" and recommended not less than four-seaters, except where the geographic size of such a constituency would be disproportionately large.

STV provides proportionality by transferring votes to minimize waste, and therefore also minimizes the number of unrepresented or disenfranchised voters.

Difficulty of implementation 
A frequent concern about STV is its complexity compared with single-mark voting methods, such as plurality voting or party-list proportional representation. Before the advent of computers, this complexity made ballot-counting more difficult than in other methods, though Winnipeg used it to elect ten MLAs in seven elections (1920–1945).

The algorithm is complicated, particularly if Gregory or another fractional-vote method is used. In large elections with many candidates, a computer may be required. (This is because after several rounds of counting, there may be many different categories of previously transferred votes, each with a different permutation of early preferences and thus each with a different carried-forward weighting, all of which have to be kept track of.)

Role of political parties
STV differs from other proportional representation systems in that candidates of one party can be elected on transfers from voters for other parties. Hence, STV may reduce the role of political parties in the electoral process and corresponding partisanship in the resulting government. A district only needs to have four members to be proportional for the major parties, but may under-represent smaller parties, even though they may well be more likely to be elected under STV than under first-past-the-post.

By-elections
As STV is a multi-member system, filling vacancies between elections can be problematic, and a variety of methods have been devised:
 The countback method is used in the Australian Capital Territory, Tasmania, Victoria, Malta, and Cambridge, Massachusetts. Casual vacancies can be filled by re-examining the ballot papers data from the previous election.
 Another option is to have a head official or remaining members of the elected body appoint a new member to fulfill the vacancy.
 A third way to fill a vacancy is to hold a single-winner by-election (effectively instant runoff); this allows each party to choose a new candidate and all voters to participate. This is the method used in the Republic of Ireland in national elections, and in Scotland's local elections.
 Yet another option is to allow the party of the vacant member to nominate a successor, possibly subject to the approval of the voting population or the rest of the government. This is the method used in the Republic of Ireland in local elections.
 Another possibility is to have the candidates themselves create an ordered list of successors before leaving their seats. In the European Parliament, a departing member from the Republic of Ireland or Northern Ireland is replaced with the top eligible name from a replacement list submitted by the candidate at the time of the original election. This method was also used in the Northern Ireland Assembly, until 2009, when the practice was changed to allow political parties to nominate new MLAs in the event of vacancies. Independent MLAs may still draw up lists of potential replacements.
 For its 2009 European elections, Malta introduced a one-off policy to elect the candidate eliminated last to fill the prospective vacancy for the extra seat that arose from the Lisbon Treaty.

Tactics

If there are not enough candidates to represent one of the priorities the electorate vote for (such as a party), all of them may be elected in the early stages, with votes being transferred to candidates with other views. On the other hand, putting up too many candidates might result in first-preference votes being spread too thinly among them, and consequently several potential winners with broad second-preference appeal may be eliminated before others are elected and their second-preference votes distributed. In practice, the majority of voters express preference for candidates from the same party in order, which minimizes the impact of this potential effect of STV.

The outcome of voting under STV is proportional within a single election to the collective preference of voters, assuming voters have ranked their real preferences. Due to other voting mechanisms usually used in conjunction with STV, such as a district or constituency system, an election by STV does not guarantee proportionality across all districts. If proportionality is measured by looking at first preference votes, the final result may vary from that proportionality due to some votes being transferred from one party to another during the vote count procedure.

Accordingly, in many elections, each party has their vote spread over the party's slate (if the party runs multiple candidates so that all the large parties' votes are spread somewhat equally), and candidates of popular parties are mostly all more popular than candidates of less-popular parties. This happened in Cavan-Monaghan in the 2020 Irish general election, where Labour, PBP, Green and Aontu parties were the least popular. Their candidates were four of the five least-popular candidates in the first count and were eliminated quickly. SF, FG and FF parties were more populartheir candidates took the five seatsand candidates of those parties were already leading in the first count.

A number of methods of tactical or strategic voting exist that can be used in STV elections but much less so than with first-past-the-post elections. In STV elections, most constituencies will be marginal, at least with regard to the allocation of a final seat. Manipulating STV requires knowledge of the contents of all the ballots, effectively only being possible after the ballots are counted; and discovering the correct votes to cast to manipulate the outcome strategically is NP-complete.

The difficulty of manipulating results under STV is credited with why it is chosen for use in part of the process of allocating Academy Awards. As part of the process of selecting winners for the Academy Awards, STV is used to choose nominees within each category. The Academy of Motion Picture Arts and Sciences claims that STV is preferred because "[a]lthough there are always instances in which an election procedure can be manipulated, an advantage of STV procedures is that the computations are too complex to be manipulated by a voter attempting to rank competitors of its most preferred candidate at the bottom of its preference list."

While STV generally does not satisfy the Condorcet criterion, Condorcet method variants like Schulze STV and CPO-STV do.

Elector confusion
Critics contend that some voters find the mechanisms behind STV difficult to understand, but this does not make it more difficult for voters to rank the list of candidates in order of preference on an STV ballot paper (see ).

STV systems vary, both in ballot design and in whether or not voters are obliged to provide a full list of preferences.

In jurisdictions such as Malta, Republic of Ireland and Northern Ireland, voters may rank as many or as few candidates as they wish. Consequently, voters sometimes, for example, rank only the candidates of a single party, or of their most preferred parties. Voters who do not fully understand the system may only vote for as many candidates as the instruction on the ballot gives before "and so on", and may even "bullet vote", only expressing a first preference, or indicate a first preference for multiple candidates, especially when both STV and plurality are being used in concurrent elections.

Allowing voters to rank only as many candidates as they wish grants them greater freedom, but can also lead to some voters ranking so few candidates that their vote eventually becomes exhausted – that is, at a certain point during the count, it can no longer be transferred and influence the result. Some are non-transferable because the choices marked have already been elected, so the voter may be pleased with the overall election result even though their first preference was not elected and their vote itself was not used to elect anyone. Even if a voter marks many preferences, the vote may still be found to be non-transferable, if at any point the vote needs to be transferred and all the preferences ranked lower have already been eliminated or elected. But the number of non-transferable votes is fewer than the number of ignored votes under first-past-the-post and the number of effective votes, votes actually used to elect someone, is higher than under all but the most landslide first-past-the-post election contests.

The STV method may be confusing to some and may cause some people to vote incorrectly with respect to their actual preferences.

STV ballots can also be long; having multiple pages increases the chances of people not marking multiple preferences and thus missing later opportunities to have their vote transferred. After a vote is transferred twice, is at the end of the count and three candidates remain in the running for the last seat, the voter may have little interest in the choice. None of them were the voter's first choice, nor their second or third preference. And perhaps the voter has already seen one or two of their earlier choices already elected. Many votes up for transfer are found to be non-transferable in the last vote transfers. One to three members at the end are often elected with partial quotas, due to the number of exhausted votes. In STV elections, a majority of votes are used to elect the members who are elected.

Other
Some opponents argue that larger, multi-seat districts would require more campaign funds to reach the voters. Proponents argue that STV can lower campaign costs because like-minded candidates can share some expenses. Proponents reason that negative advertising is disincentivized in such a system, as its effect is diluted among a larger pool of candidates.

In addition, candidates do not have to secure the support of the largest voting block to be elected as under FPTP. STV ensures that each substantial group gets at least one seat, allowing candidates to focus campaign spending primarily on supportive voters. Under STV, it is not necessary to be the most popular candidate in the district to be elected; it is only necessary to have quota (or survive to the end when the remaining candidates are declared elected). To have quota, you do not need support from across the district necessarily. If a corner of the district has a quota worth of votes and the voters there support a candidate, that candidate will be elected and there is nothing the others elsewhere in the district can do about it. So, at least theoretically, you would not need to campaign across the district.

The larger, multi-member constituencies can result in less, rather than more, representation of local communities within the electoral district. The representatives could potentially all be from one part of the region, leaving other communities without representation.

Furthermore, STV requires multi-member districts (MMDs). It is thus impossible to use MMDs in the Scottish Highlands to elect member of the UK Parliament because only one member is elected in that area. To create an MMD in a sparsely-settled area, an electoral district would have to cover a large area just to capture the required population to be represented by multiple members. There can be a greater disconnect between the voter, or community, and their representatives. If areas with low population density were using multi-member districts to elect the relatively few high-level members of Parliament in Scotland or of the UK Parliament, constituencies could become so large as to seem to be impractical. However, Scotland successfully uses multiple-member regions in its Scottish Parliament elections and STV in its Local Authority elections. The large number of Local Authority or Scottish Parliament members allows the creation of MMDs without having each district cover too large an area. Meanwhile, MMDs even of immense size can be used successfully. In New South Wales, Australia, the whole state elects 21 members of the upper house in one single STV contest and has done so since 1991.

Analysis of results
Academic analysis of voting systems such as STV generally centres on the voting system criteria that they pass. No preference voting system satisfies all the criteria in Arrow's impossibility theorem: in particular, STV fails to achieve independence of irrelevant alternatives (like most other vote-based ordering systems) and monotonicity.

Migration of preferences
The relative performance of political parties in STV systems is sometimes analysed in a different fashion from that used in other electoral schemes. For example, seeing which candidates are declared elected on first-preference votes alone in the 2012 Scottish local elections, where 1223 members were elected, can be shown as follows:

The data can also be analysed to find the proportion of voters who express only a single preference, or those who express a minimum number of preferences, to assess party strength. Where parties nominate multiple candidates in an electoral district, analysis can also be done to assess their relative strength.

Other useful information can be found by analysing terminal transfersi.e., when the votes of a candidate are transferred and no other candidate from that party remains in the countespecially with respect to the first instance in which that occurs:

The transfers of votes under STV mean that candidates who did well on first-preference votes in the first count (but not well enough to be immediately declared elected) may not be elected in the end, and those who did poorly on the first count may be elected in the end. This is due to transfers made according to second and later preferences. This can also be analysed, again using the 1223 members elected in the Scottish local elections. Some of the leading candidates in the first count were not elected but, comparing the number to the total number of members elected in these elections, the successful candidates were mostly set in the first count (through the simple mechanics of single voting in multi-member districts), before any vote transfers are done. Only about ten percent or less of the front runners in the first count were not elected in the end.

Only 68 of the elected members, of the overall 1,223 successful candidates, were not already in a winning position in the first count, thus showing that vote transfers merely put a polish on the first-count ranking of candidates established through single voting in multi-seat districts.

Thus, of 1223 seats filled in 2012, only 68 were filled by candidates who were not in top three or four spots in the first count. Therefore, transfers changed the outcome of only about 6 percent of the spots. Single non-transferable vote would have provided the same results in a great majority of cases.

Effective votes
Looking at the 2020 Irish election where members of Dáil Éireann, known as TDs (Dáil deputies), were elected by single transferable vote from 39 constituencies, each with between three and five seats, members were elected under STV with about the same number of votes and that a large proportion of votes cast in each district were used to actually elect someone. Most elected members were elected by achieving the quota. Thus they were elected by receiving approximately the same number of votes. The few elected without quota received a number of votes close to quota as well. A large proportion of the votes were used to elect someone, with relatively few being wasted. Perhaps one full quota or less is not used to elect someone.

In Cambridge, Massachusetts, under STV in 2021, 90 percent of voters saw their vote help to elect a candidate, more than 65 percent of voters saw their first choice candidate elected, and more than 95 percent of voters saw one of their top three choices elected.

See also

 Tally (voting)
 None of the above
 Approval voting
 Single non-transferable vote
 Table of voting systems by country
 Voting matters, a journal concerned with the technical aspects of STV

Notes

References

Bibliography

Further reading

External links
 ACE Project
 A concise STV analogy – from Accurate Democracy
 Accurate Democracy lists a dozen programs for computing the single transferable vote.
 Australia's Upper Houses – ABC Rear Vision A podcast about the development of Australia's upper houses into STV elected chambers.

 
Non-monotonic electoral systems
Preferential electoral systems
Proportional representation electoral systems
Electoral systems
Electoral reform in Canada